The History of Punjab refers to the past human history of Punjab region which is a geopolitical, cultural, and historical region in the northwest of the Indian subcontinent, comprising western Punjab province in Pakistan and eastern Punjab state in India. It is believed that the earliest evidence of human habitation in Punjab traces to the Soan valley of the Pothohar, between the Indus and the Jhelum rivers, where Soanian culture developed between 774,000 BC and 11,700 BC. This period goes back to the first interglacial period in the second Ice Age, from which remnants of stone and flint tools have been found.

The Punjab region was the site of one of the earliest cradle of civilizations, the Bronze Age Harrapan civilization that flourished from about 3000 B.C. and declined rapidly 1,000 years later, following the Indo-Aryan migrations that overran the region in waves between 1500 and 500 B.C. The migrating Indo-Aryan tribes gave rise to the Iron Age Vedic civilization, which lasted till 500 BC. During this era, the Rigveda was composed in Punjab, laying the foundation of Hinduism. Following Alexander the Great's invasion and his conflicts with Porus and the Malli tribe of Multan, Chandragupta founded the Maurya Empire. After its decline the Indo-Greeks, Kushan Empire and Indo-Scythians successively established kingdoms in Punjab. The rulers of these kingdoms were patrons of  Buddhism and Taxila became a great centre of learning and commerce. The Buddhist Gandhara civilization in the north of Punjab reached its height under the Kushan Empire in 2nd and 3rd century AD. Between the 4th century BC – 4th century AD, the Eastern region of Punjab was ruled by numerous republics (Yaudheyas, Trigartas, Audumbaras and Arjunayanas) which defeated the Indo-Greek Kingdom and issued their own coinage. 

The devastating Hunnic invasions of Punjab occurred in the 5th and 6th century, which were ultimately repelled by the Vardhana dynasty. Most of the western Punjab region became unified under the Taank kingdom which was established in the 6th century. In the 8th century it was replaced with the Hindu Shahis. Between the 8th and 12th century, the Tomara dynasty and Katoch dynasty controlled the eastern Punjab region. Islam became established in Punjab when the Umayyad Caliphate conquered southern portions of the region up to Multan, which became independent from the caliphate under the Emirate of Multan in 855 AD. The Ghaznavids conquered region in 1025, after whom the Delhi Sultanate followed. The Langah Sultanate ruled much of south Punjab in the 15th century.

The Mughal Empire, established in 1526 AD, has left an immense cultural and architectural legacy in Punjab. The city of  Lahore became one of the largest in the world under Mughals. In 16th century, Sikhism was founded by Guru Nanak in central Punjab which attracted many followers. After a long period of anarchy due to decline of Mughals in 18th century, the Sikh Empire in 1799 AD unified most of the Punjab region. The region was conquered by the British in 1849 AD after Second Anglo-Sikh War and Punjab province was created in 1857. In 1947, Punjab was partitioned which saw some of the most violent riots and massacres of the 20th century. Today most of Punjab including Lahore is part of Pakistan, with a smaller portion in India.

Etymology
The word pañjāb thus means 'The Land of Five Waters', referring to the rivers Jhelum, Chenab, Ravi, Sutlej, and Beas. All are tributaries of the Indus River, the Sutlej being the largest. References to a land of five rivers may be found in the Mahabharata, which calls one of the regions in ancient Bharat  Panchanada. The ancient Greeks referred to the region as Pentapotamía, which has the same meaning as the Persian word.

Geographical extent
Today Punjab region is usually considered to consist of Punjab province in Pakistan and Punjab state in India. The boundaries of the region are ill-defined and focus on historical accounts and thus the geographical definition of the term "Punjab" has changed over time. In the 16th century, Mughal Empire referred it to a relatively smaller area between the Indus and the Sutlej rivers. In British Raj, the Punjab Province was a large administrative region encompassing the present-day Indian states and union territories of Punjab, Haryana, Himachal Pradesh, Chandigarh, and Delhi and the Pakistani regions of Punjab and Islamabad Capital Territory. It bordered Balochistan and North-West Frontier to the west, Jammu and Kashmir to the north, the Hindi Belt to the east, and Rajasthan and Sindh to the south.

Prehistory

Paleolithic

Homo erectus lived on the Pothohar Plateau, in upper Punjab, Pakistan along the Soan River (nearby modern-day Rawalpindi) during the Pleistocene Epoch. Soanian sites are found in the Sivalik region across what are now India, Pakistan and Nepal. The Soanian culture was a prehistoric technological culture from the Siwalik Hills. It is named after the Soan Valley in Punjab, Pakistan. The Soanian culture has been approximated to have taken place during the Middle Pleistocene period or the mid-Holocene epoch (Northgrippian). Soanian artifacts were manufactured on quartzite pebbles, cobbles, and occasionally on boulders, all derived from various fluvial sources on the Siwalik landscape. Soanian assemblages generally comprise varieties of choppers, discoids, scrapers, cores, and numerous flake type tools, all occurring in varying typo-technological frequencies at different sites.

Neolithic
Relics and human skulls have been found dating back to 5000 BCE in the Pothohar Plateau in north of Punjab that indicate the region was home to Neolithic peoples who settled on the banks of the Swaan River, and who later developed small communities in the region around 3000 BCE.

Bronze Age (3300 BC – 1300 BC)

The Indus Valley Civilisation is also known as the Harappan civilisation, after its type site Harappa, the first to be excavated early in the 20th century in Punjab. The discovery of Harappa and soon afterwards Mohenjo-daro was the culmination of work that had begun after the founding of the Archaeological Survey of India in the British Raj in 1861.

The civilisation flourished both in the alluvial plain of the Indus River, which flows through the length of Pakistan, and along a system of perennial monsoon-fed rivers that once coursed in the vicinity of the Ghaggar-Hakra, a seasonal river in northwest India and eastern Pakistan.The cities of the ancient Indus were noted for their urban planning, baked brick houses, elaborate drainage systems, water supply systems, clusters of large non-residential buildings, and techniques of handicraft and metallurgy. Mohenjo-daro and Harappa very likely grew to contain between 30,000 and 60,000 individuals, and the civilisation may have contained between one and five million individuals during its florescence.  A gradual drying of the region during the 3rd millennium BCE may have been the initial stimulus for its urbanisation. Eventually it also reduced the water supply enough to cause the civilisation's demise and to disperse its population to the east.

Iron Age  (c.1300 BC – 518 BC)

During the Iron Age, first legendary kingdoms appeared in Punjab including Gandhara, Kekya, Madra, Trigarta, Sivi and Bahlikas. Literary evidence from the Vedic Era suggests a transition from early small janas, or tribes, to many Janapadas (territorial civilisations) and s. The latter are loosely translated to being oligarchies or republics. These political entities were represented from the Rigveda to the Astadhyayi by Panini. Archaeologically, the time span of these entities corresponds to phases also present in the Indo-Gangetic divide and the upper Gangetic basin.

Some of the early Janas of the Rig Veda can be strongly attributed to Punjab. Although their distribution patterns are not satisfactorily ascertainable, they are associated with the Porusni, Asikni, Satudri, Vipas, and Saraswati. The rivers of Punjab often corresponded to the eastern Janapadas. Rig Vedic Janas such as the Druhyus, Anus, Purus, Yadus, Turvasas, Bharatas, and others were associated in Punjab and the Indo-Gangetic plain. Other Rig Vedic Janapadas such as the Pakhthas, Bhalanasas, Visanins, and Sivas were associated with areas in the north and west of Punjab.

An important event of the Rig Vedic era was the "Battle of Ten Kings" which was fought on the banks of the river Parusni (Ravi river) in central Punjab, in c.14th century BCE, between the Bharata clan on the one hand and a confederation of ten tribes on the other. The ten tribes pitted against Sudas comprised five major tribes: the Purus, the Druhyus, the Anus, the Turvasas and the Yadus; in addition to five minor ones: the Pakthas, the Alinas, the Bhalanas, the Visanins and the Sivas. Sudas was supported by the Vedic Rishi Vasishtha, while his former Purohita, the Rishi Viswamitra, sided with the confederation of ten tribes. Sudas had earlier defeated Samvaran and ousted him from Hastinapur. It was only after the death of Sudas that Samvaran could return to his kingdom.

A second battle, referred to as the Mahabharat in ancient texts, was fought in Punjab on a battlefield known as Kurukshetra. This was fought between the Pandavas and the Kauravas. Duryodhana, a descendant of Kuru (who was the son of king Samvaran), had tried to insult the Panchali princess Draupadi in revenge for defeating his ancestor Samvaran.

Many Janapadas were mentioned from Vedic texts and there was a large level of contact between all the Janapadas with descriptions being given of trading caravans, movement of students from universities, and itineraries of princes. In its heyday, the University of ancient Taxila attracted students from all over Indian subcontinent as well as those from surrounding countries.

Ancient Punjab (518 BC  – c.500 AD )

Achaemenid Empire  (518 BC  – 326 BC)  

Cyrus the Great invaded and annexed the lands to the west of the Indus river, around 535 BCE. His son Darius the Great, in 518 BCE crossed the Indus and annex the regions up to the Jhelum River. Taxila is considered to be the possible capital of the Achaemenid province of Hindush.

Alexander's invasion 

Frequent intertribal wars stimulated the growth of larger groupings ruled by chieftains and kings, who ruled local kingdoms known as Mahajanapadas. The rise of kingdoms and dynasties in the Punjab is chronicled in the ancient Hindu epics, particularly the Mahabharata. In 326 B.C. The earliest known notable local king of this region was known as King Porus, who fought the famous Battle of the Hydaspes against Alexander the Great. His kingdom spanned between rivers Hydaspes (Jhelum) and Acesines (Chenab); Strabo had held the territory to contain almost 300 cities. He (alongside Abisares) had a hostile relationship with the Kingdom of Taxila which was ruled by his extended family. When the armies of Alexander crossed Indus in its eastward migration, probably in Udabhandapura, he was greeted by the-then ruler of Taxila, Omphis. Omphis had hoped to force both Porus and Abisares into submission leveraging the might of Alexander's forces and diplomatic missions were mounted, but while Abisares accepted the submission, Porus refused. This led Alexander to seek for a face-off with Porus. Thus began the Battle of the Hydaspes in 326 BC; the exact site remains unknown. The battle is thought to be resulted in a decisive Greek victory; however, A. B. Bosworth warns against an uncritical reading of Greek sources who were obviously exaggerative. Alexander later founded two cities—Nicaea at the site of victory and Bucephalous at the battle-ground, in memory of his horse, who died soon after the battle. Later, tetradrachms would be minted depicting Alexander on horseback, armed with a sarissa and attacking a pair of Indians on an elephant. Porus refused to surrender and wandered about atop an elephant, until he was wounded and his force routed.

When asked by Alexander how he wished to be treated, Porus replied "Treat me as a king would treat another king". Despite the apparently one-sided results, Alexander was impressed by Porus and chose to not depose him. Not only was his territory reinstated but also expanded with Alexander's forces annexing the territories of Glausaes, who ruled to the northeast of Porus' kingdom. The battle is historically significant because it resulted in the syncretism of ancient Greek political and cultural influences to the Indian subcontinent, yielding works such as Greco-Buddhist art, which continued to have an impact for the ensuing centuries.

After battle of Hydaspes, Alexander moved further southward during his in Punjab which brought him in confrontation to the Mallian tribe in the south Punjab. The Malli, together with nearby tribe of Oxydracj, gathered an army of 90,000 personnel to fight against an army of 50,000 Greeks. Alexander started his Mallian campaign and advanced quickly than the expectations of the Mallians. Many of them were killed and rest fled to the Mallian capital, Multan. Alexander besieged the city after arriving there some days later. During the siege of the city's citadel, Alexander reputedly leaped into the inner area of the citadel, where he killed the Mallians' leader. Alexander was wounded by an arrow that had penetrated his lung, leaving him severely injured.  The Greek army thereafter started killing civilians and animals and whatever came in their way to take revenge of their injured leader. The Mallian army eventually surrendered, preventing further bloodshed.

Eastern Punjab Republics (4th BC - 4th AD) 
The Eastern Punjab republics, known as the Punjab Janapadas, were a group of republics during the ancient period of Punjab which were militaristic in nature, consisting of the Yaudheyas, Arjunayanas, Kunindas, Trigartas and the Audumbaras. Before the rise of the Mauryan empire and the eventual defeat of the Nanda Empire, Chandragupta sought an alliance with these republics, most notably the Yaudheyas and the Trigartas, before pursuing Dhana Nanda. According to the Sanskrit and Jain texts Mudrarakshasa and Parishishtaparvan, Chandragupta made an alliance with the Trigarta chief Parvatek who's dominion spread into the Himachal hills and his capital at Jalandhar. The chief of the Mauryan military was always a Yaudheyan warrior according to the Bijaygadh Pillar inscription, which states that the Yaudheyas elected their own chief who also served as the general for the Mauryan army. The core of the Mauryan army and Chandraguptas initial military when battling the Nandas, was made of up men from the Punjab Janapadas according to Thomas William Rhys Davids.

After the eventual fall of the Mauryans, the Indo-Greek Kingdom took its place in the Western Punjab. The Eastern Punjab supposedly wouldn't become subdued till the rule of Menander I, however there is little evidence of conflicts with the republics till after his death where the republics then begin to battle with his successors. The Trigartas producing their own coinage, the Yaudheyas and Arjunayanas winning "victory by the sword" and the Audumbaras under their ruler Dharagosha checking the indo Greek advance to the upper bari doab (ravi river) defining their control in the region.

C. Two centuries after defeating the Indo-Greeks, the republics would become controlled by the Kushans under Kanishka, with him conquering Punjab. However in the early 3rd century BC after his death, a union formed between the republics to expel the Kushans, resulting in a Kushan defeat and them being pushed out of Eastern Punjab, as stated by the historian Anant Sadashiv Altekar. This can also be confirmed through their coinage inscription stating 'Yaudheyanam jayamantra daramanam' boasting their military victory.  

A century later according to the Allahabad pillar inscription, the republics would become tributaries of the Guptas, however this would be done without a fight and according to Upinder Singh there is no specific mention of them proving troops. This period ultimately saw the disappearance of the republics.

Mauryan Empire (316 BC  – 180 BC) 

Chandragupta Maurya, with the aid of Kautilya, had established his empire around 320 BC. The early life of Chandragupta Maurya is not clear. Kautilya enrolled the young Chandragupta in the university at Taxila to educate him in the arts, sciences, logic, mathematics, warfare, and administration. Megasthenes' account, as it has survived in Greek texts that quote him, states that Alexander the Great and Chandragupta met, which if true would mean his rule started earlier than 321 BC. As Alexander never crossed the Beas river, so his territory probably lied in Punjab region. He has also been variously identified with Shashigupta (who has same etymology as of Chandragupta) of Paropamisadae (western Punjab) on the account of same life events. With the help of the small Janapadas of Punjab and Sindh, he had gone on to conquer much of the North West Indian subcontinent. He then defeated the Nanda rulers in Pataliputra to capture the throne. Chandragupta Maurya fought Alexander's successor in the east, Seleucus when the latter invaded. In a peace treaty, Seleucus ceded all territories west of the Indus and offered a marriage, including a portion of Bactria, while Chandragupta granted Seleucus 500 elephants. The chief of the Mauryan military was also always a Yaudheyan warrior according to the Bijaygadh Pillar inscription, which states that the Yaudheyas elected their own chief who also served as the general for the Mauryans. The Mauryan military was also made up vastly of men from the Punjab Janapadas.

Chandragupta's rule was very well organised. The Mauryans had an autocratic and centralised administration system, aided by a council of ministers, and also a well-established espionage system. Much of Chandragupta's success is attributed to Chanakya, the author of the Arthashastra. Much of the Mauryan rule had a strong bureaucracy that had regulated tax collection, trade and commerce, industrial activities, mining, statistics and data, maintenance of public places, and upkeep of temples.

Mauryan rule was advanced for its time, and foreign accounts of Indian cities mention many temples, libraries, universities, gardens, and parks. A notable account was that of the Greek ambassador Megasthenes who had visited the Mauryan capital of Pataliputra.

Indo-Greek Kingdom (c.180 BC  – c.20 BC) 

The Indo-Greek kingdom was founded when the Graeco-Bactrian king Demetrius (and later Eucratides) invaded Punjab from Bactria in 200 BC, taking advantage of decline of Mauryans. The Greeks in the Indian Subcontinent were eventually divided from the Graeco-Bactrians centered on Bactria (now the border between Afghanistan and Uzbekistan), and the Indo-Greeks in the present-day north-western Indian Subcontinent. Later, Menander I Soter conquered Punjab and made Sagala (present-day Sialkot) the capital of the Indo-Greek Kingdom. Menander is noted for having become a patron and convert to Greco-Buddhism and he is widely regarded as the greatest of the Indo-Greek kings.

The expression "Indo-Greek Kingdom" loosely describes a number of various dynastic polities, traditionally associated with a number of regional capitals like Taxila, Pushkalavati and Sagala. Other potential centers are only hinted at; for instance, Ptolemy's Geographia and the nomenclature of later kings suggest that a certain Theophila in the south of the Indo-Greek sphere of influence may also have been a satrapal or royal seat at one time.

During the two centuries of their rule, the Indo-Greek kings combined the Greek and Indian languages and symbols, as seen on their coins, and blended Greek and Indian ideas, as seen in the archaeological remains. The diffusion of Indo-Greek culture had consequences which are still felt today, particularly through the influence of Greco-Buddhist art. Following the death of Menander,  most of his empire splintered and Indo-Greek influence was considerably reduced. Many new kingdoms and republics east of the Ravi River began to mint new coinage depicting military victories.  The most prominent entities to form were the Yaudheya Republic,  Arjunayanas, and the Audumbaras. The Yaudheyas and Arjunayanas both are said to have won "victory by the sword"  and the Audumbaras are said to of checked the Indo-Greek advance all the way up the upper bari doab, depicting a short Indo-Greek rule in Eastern Punjab. The Datta dynasty and Mitra dynasty soon followed in Mathura. The Indo-Greeks ultimately disappeared as a political entity around 10 AD following the invasions of the Indo-Scythians, although pockets of Greek populations probably remained for several centuries longer under the subsequent rule of the Indo-Parthians and Kushans.

Indo-Scythian Kingdom  (c.20 BC  – c.30 AD) 

The Indo-Scythians were descended from the Sakas (Scythians) who migrated from southern Siberia to Punjab, Pakistan and Arachosia from the middle of the 2nd century BCE to the 1st century BCE. They displaced the earlier Indo-Greeks. The power of the Saka rulers started to decline in the 2nd century CE and soon they were replaced with Indo-Parthians by the mid 1st century AD.

Indo-Parthian Kingdom  (c.30 AD  – c.50 AD) 

The Indo-Parthian Kingdom was founded by Gondophares, and active from 19 CE to c. 226 CE. The city of Taxila is thought to have been a capital of the Indo-Parthians however this is where the Eastern boundary of the empire was limited to. The Greek philosopher Apollonius of Tyana is related by Philostratus in Life of Apollonius of Tyana to have visited India, and specifically the city of Taxila around 46 AD. He describes constructions of the Greek type, probably referring to Sirkap, and explains that the Indo-Parthian king of Taxila, named Phraotes, received a Greek education at the court. The kingdom was conquered in 1st century AD by the Kushan empire.

Kushan Empire  (c.50 AD  – c.350 AD) 

About the middle of the 1st century CE, the Kushan Empire expanded out of central Asia into the Punjab under the leadership of their first emperor, Kujula Kadphises. They were descended from an Indo-European, Central Asian people called the Yuezhi, a branch of which was known as the Kushans. By the time of his grandson, Kanishka, the empire spread to encompass much of south Asia at least as far as Saketa and Sarnath near Varanasi (Benares). By the 3rd century, their empire in Indian subcontinent was disintegrating and their last known great emperor was Vasudeva I. Following territory losses in the west (Bactria lost to the Kushano-Sasanians), and in the east (loss of Mathura to the Gupta Empire), several "Little Kushans" are known, who ruled locally in the area of Punjab with their capital at Taxila: Vasudeva II (270–300), Mahi (300–305), Shaka (305–335) and Kipunada (335–350). They probably were vassals of the Gupta Empire, until the invasion of the Kidarites destroyed the last remains of Kushan rule. In the early 3rd century BC, a union formed between the Punjab janapadas to expel the Kushans, resulting in a Kushan defeat and them being pushed all the way out of Eastern Punjab. Thus starting the fall of the empire and resulting in a century of peace in Punjab before the Gupta expansion. Ancient Communities of the Himalaya

Gupta Empire 

Following decline of Kushans, the Gupta Empire gradually extended its rule as far as Punjab.  This time period is known as the golden age of the region, especially during the reign of Skanda Gupta. The Gupta rule in Punjab was indirect, with the previously mentioned Eastern Punjab republics acting as vassals to the empire rather then being directly annexed through conquest.
 
After the death of Skanda Gupta, the Empire suffered from various wars of succession. The last major Gupta King was Buddha Gupta; after him, the Empire had split into various branches across India. The last Guptas were defeated by the Huns who had established themselves in Punjab under Toramana and his son Mihirakula, described as a Saivite Hindu.

Buddhism in the Punjab declined after the Gupta Empire due to preference give to the rise of the propagation of Hinduism again in the region.

Hunnic migrations (c.350 AD  – c.500 AD)

After decline of Kushan empire, the central Asian Huns started migrating towards Punjab and other regions of Pakistan. First of them were the Kidarites, who around 390 AD invaded Punjab and replaced remaining remnants of the Kushans. They seem to have retained the western part of the Gupta Empire, particularly central and western Punjab, until they were displaced by the invasion of the Alchon Huns at the end of the 5th century.

The Alchon Huns were a nomadic people who invaded South Asia during the 5th and 6th centuries AD. They were first mentioned as being located in Paropamisus. Between 460 and 470 AD, the Alchons took over Gandhara and Western Punjab which also had remained under the control of the Kidarites, while the Gupta Empire remained further east. Their most famous ruler was Mihirakula who had capital in Sagala in northern Punjab.

Decline of Buddhism 

The Alchons apparently undertook the mass destruction of Buddhist monasteries and stupas at Taxila, a high center of learning, which never recovered from the destruction. Virtually all of the Alchon coins found in the area of Taxila were found in the ruins of burned down monasteries, where apparently some of the invaders died alongside local defenders during the wave of destructions. One of the long lasting impact of this was the decline of Buddhism in Punjab, which was soon replaced by Hinduism as the major religion.

Medieval Punjab (c.500 AD  – 1526 AD)

Vardhana empire (6th AD – 7th AD) 
In the 6th century AD the Vardhana dynasty, based in the area of Thanesar (Ambala district of Eastern Punjab), rose to prominence during the second hunnic wars. Its first notable ruler, Adityavardhana, according to the Mandsaur fragmentary inscription conquered the region of Mandsaur between 497 and 500 AD, later also taking part in the Battle of Sondani with Yashodharman which saw the defeat of the Alchon hun ruler Mihirakula.

Adityavardhanas successor, Prabhakaravardhana, according to Bāṇabhaṭṭa, who was the court poet for Harsha, credits him with a strong stance against the Hunas, describing him as :"A lion to the Huna deer, a burning fever to the king of the Indus land (Sindh), a troubler of the sleep of Gujarat king, a billious plague to that scent-elephant, the lord of Gandhara, a destroyer of the skill of the Latas." Inferring various conquests during his reign.

His death in 605 AD led to his eldest son Rajyavardhana, who was battling the Huns in Ghandara with his brother Harsha at the time of his death, succeeding him. The Maukhari king, Grahavarman, was married to Rajyavardhanas sister, but some years later he had been killed by the king of Malwa, leading to her being captured. In retaliation, Rajyavardhana marched against the King and defeated him. However Shashanka of Gauda (Eastern Bengal), in secret alliance with the Malwa king, entered Magadha as a friend of Rajyavardhana. but treacherously murdered him in c. 606 AD.

The Harshacharita states that Prabhakara's younger son Harsha-Vardhana then vowed to destroy the Gauda (Eastern Bengal) king and their allies. He formed an alliance with Bhaskar Varman, the king of Kamarupa, and forced Shashanka to retreat. Subsequently, Harsha was formally crowned as an emperor  after he united the small republics from Punjab to central India. Their representatives crowned him king at an assembly in April 606 AD giving him the title of Maharaja. Harsha established an empire that brought all of northern India under his control. 

The rough territorial extent of the Vardhana empire according to Cunningham was between the areas of Kashmir, Maharashtra and Ganjam, and from the description of Xuanzang his empire comprised the 'most fertile and richest provinces of India' which includes the area of Punjab and Bengal.

Taank Kingdom (6th AD - 8th AD)

The Chinese monk Xuanzang visited in 630 AD and described a large and prosperous kingdom, Taank Kingdom in Punjab. It ruled the region in 6th and 7th centuries, as evident from the chronicles of Xuanzang and other sources. The country was located south of Kashmir and east of Zunbil dynasty, extending from the Indus river in the west to the Beas river in the east, centered around modern day Sialkot.

Hindu Shahi Empire (9th AD – 11th AD)

In the ninth century, the Hindu Shahi dynasty, with their origins disputed between the region of Oddiyana and being Punjabi Brahmins, replaced the Takka kingdom in the Punjab, ruling much of Western Punjab along with eastern Afghanistan. In the 10th century, the tribe of the Gakhars/Khokhars formed a large part of the Hindu Shahi army according to the Persian historian Firishta. Three of the most notable rulers were Lalliya, Bhimadeva and Jayapala.

Lalliya had reclaimed the territory at and around Kabul between 879 and 901 BC after it had been lost under his predecessor to the Saffarid dynasty. He was described as a fearsome Shahi. Two of his ministers reconstructed by Rahman as Toramana and Asata are said to of have taken advantage of Amr al-Layth's preoccupation with rebellions in Khorasan, by successfully raiding Ghazna around 900 BC.

After a defeat in Eastern Afghanistan suffered on the Shahi ally Lawik, Bhimadeva mounted a combined attack around 963 BC. Abu Ishaq Ibrahim was expelled from Ghazna and Shahi-Lawik strongholds were restored in Kabul and adjacent areas. This victory appears to have been commemorated in the Hund Slab Inscription (HSI):

Tomar and Katoch dynasties (10th AD – 12th AD) 
After the Ghaznavids conquest of the Hindu Shahis which led to the annexation of Western Punjab into their empire in the 11th century AD, two Punjab dynasties who ruled the territory in the East, the Katoch dynasty based in the region from Himachal Pradesh to Jalandhar and the Tomara dynasty based in the regions of modern day Haryana, Delhi and East Punjab, became heavily involved in conflicts with the Ghaznavids.

According to the Dutch sanskritist J. Ph. Vogel, in 1043 AD, the Raja of the Tomaras conquered the occupied cities of Hansi,Thanesar and other places held by Ghaznavid garrisons under Mawdud of Ghazni, before successfully besieging the once captured Nagarkot fort, located in the Kangra district of modern day Himachal Pradesh, Eastern Punjab.  He further states that Mahmud of Ghazni's, son Abd al-Rashid, captured the fort in c. 1052 AD but the Kangra rajas led an expedition which successfully recaptured the Kangra fort in 1060 AD, he then concludes that for the next 300 years it would remain in their control.During the reign of Ibrahim of Ghazna (1059-1099) an army of ghazis consisting of 40,000 cavalry was sent to raid the Doab of the Punjab region under his son Mahmud, c. 1070 AD which led to a battle near the city of Jalandhar. The outcome of the battle is uncertain and Jalandhar is not noticed in Ghaznavid annals however according to the Diwan-i-salman it was described as eclipsing the battles of Rustam and Isfandiyar.

During the reign of Ibrahim of Ghazna, the Tomar raja popularly as Anangpal Tomar, as per his contemporary Vibudh Shridhar's Parshwanath Charit, defeated the Turks at Himachal pradesh. According to J. Ph. Vogel, the Bard chand states that the Kangra and its mountain chiefs owed allegience  to Anangpal showing that it was potentially subject to the Tomaras.

Arrival of Islam and the Emirate of Multan 
At the beginning of the 8th century, Arab armies of the Umayyad Caliphate penetrated into South Asia. In 712 the Umayyads conquered Sindh and Southern Punjab up to Multan, and Islam emerged as a major power in the southern Punjab. The newly conquered region became known as Sind and was the easternmost state of the Umayyad Caliphate. Umayyad rule was later replaced with Abbasid rule in 750.

In the mid 800s, Abbasid authority in Sind weakened and five independent principalities emerged. The Banu Munnabih  established themselves based at Multan. The Banu Munnabih later gave allegiance to the Abbasids, and remained unchallenged for over a century. Visitors at the time noted the power, prestige and prosperity brought to the region under Banu Munnabih rule.

Between 982–5, the power of the Banu Munnabih began to erode and Multan was conquered by Halam b. Shayban on behalf of the Fatimid caliph based in Egypt. By 985, the traveller Al-Maqdisi noted that the city of Multan was Shia, that the Friday sermon was in the name of the Fatimid and all decisions are taken in accordance with his commands.

Ghaznavid Empire (10th AD - 12th AD)

In 977, Sabuktigin, the Samanid governor of Ghazni, established an independent kingdom in western Afghanistan with Ghazni as its capital. When the Ghaznavids began expanding eastwards they came into conflict with the Hindu Shahis. This led to the Hindu Shahi ruler to form an alliance with Rajput rulers in the Punjab to check the Ghaznavid expansion.

Sabuktigin's son Mahmud succeeded his father in 997, and began a series of raids into northern India. In 1001 he defeated Jayapala at the Battle of Peshawar and seized Hindu Shahi territory north of the river Sindh. In 1006 Mahmud attacked the Kingdom of Multan, returning a few years later to massacre the local Ismaili population.

Jayapala's son and grandson, Anandapala and Trilochanapala respectively, resisted Mahmud for another quarter of a century and later by Bhimapala and local Ghakkhar chieftains until Mu'izz ad-Din Muhammad's victory in Second battle of Tarain in 1192  . Mahmud's battles against the Hindu Shahi between 1001 and 1026 were significant in establishing Muslim political dominance in the Afghanistan region and surrounding Gandhar region west of Punjab. After Ghazni was conquered by Ghurid Empire, the capital of the Ghaznavids shifted to Lahore in Punjab which remained as their last capital.

Delhi Sultanate

In 1173 the Ghurid dynasty replaced the Ghaznavids in Ghazni, and under Muhammad of Ghor they began expanding eastwards. Between 1175 and 1192, the Ghurid dynasty occupied the cities of Uch, Multan, Peshawar, Lahore, and Delhi. In 1206, the Ghurid general Qutb-al-din Aybeg and his successor Iltutmish founded the first of the series of Delhi Sultanates. Each dynasty would be an alternation of various inner-Asian military lords and their clients, constantly vying for power. These sultanates would make Delhi a safe haven for Muslim Turks and Persians who would flee the eventual Mongol invasions.

Khilji dynasty (1290 AD – 1320 AD) 
The Khalji dynasty was the second dynasty of the Delhi sultanates, ruling from 1290 to 1320. This dynasty was a short-lived one, and extended Islamic rule to Gujarat, Rajasthan, the Deccan, and parts of Southern India. The first Mongol invasion of Punjab occurred when they were pursuing the Khwarezmian Shah, Jalal ad-Din, who was defeated in the battle of Indus in 1221. The early period of te dynasty saw numerous Mongol invasions of Punjab, and the cities of Multan and Lahore were even sacked. Ultimately, they were defeated during the rule by its able generals, Zafar Khan, Ayn al-Mulk Multani and Ghazi Malik who were Punjab Muslims. In the winter of 1297, the Chagatai noyan Kadar led an army that ravaged the Punjab region, and advanced as far as Kasur. Alauddin's army, led by Ulugh Khan and probably Zafar Khan defeated the invaders on the Battle of Jaran-Manjur near Lahore in 1298 where quite a large number of them were taken prisoner.

Tughlaq dynasty (1320 AD – 1410 AD) 
The Tughlaq dynasty's reign formally started in 1320 in Delhi when Ghazi Malik assumed the throne under the title of Ghiyath al-Din Tughluq after defeating Khusrau Khan at the Battle of Lahrawat.

The ancestry of the dynasty is debated among modern historians because the earlier sources provide different information regarding it. Tughlaq's court poet Badr-i Chach attempted to find a royal Sassanian genealogy for the dynasty from the line of Bahram Gur. According to Bhandari and Firishta, Tughlaq was born in Punjab to a Punjabi mother. Another of Tughlaq's court poet Amir Khusrau in his Tughlaq Nama neglects any mention of Tughlaq's arrival in India from a foreign land, presuming he was born in India. His own court poet states that Tughluq described himself frankly as a man of no importance ("awara mard") in his early life and career, something that all of his audience knew. Tughlaq Nama declares Tughlaq to have been a minor chief of humble origins. Ferishta, based on inquiries at Lahore, wrote that the knowledgeable historians and the books of India had neglected to mention any clear statement on the origin of the dynasty, but wrote that there was a rural founding myth that Tughlaq's father was a Turkic slave of Balban who married daughter of Punjabi jatt chieftain of Punjab. However there are no contemporary sources corroborate this statement. The historian Fouzia Ahmed points out that as per the Tughlaq Nama, Tughlaq was not a Balbanid slave because he was not part of the old Turkic nobility, as his family was of humble origins which was newly emergent only during Alai rule. Instead, in the Tughlaq Nama Tughlaq expressed his loyalty to the ethnically heterogenous Alai regime as his benefactor through which he first entered military service but makes no mention of Balban because his father was never part of Balban's old Sultanate household. The link with the region of Punjab was also exemplified in the support of the Punjabi Khokhar tribes to Ghazi Malik, who played the central role in his rise to the monarchy. His own court poet, Amir Khusro, wrote a war ballad known as the Vaar in the Punjabi language for the Sultan describing the introduction to his rise to the throne against Khusrau Shah. Tughlaq's administration was dominated by Punjabis from Southern Punjab such as Ayn al-Mulk Multani, indicating their ties to the area and people.The city of Dipalpur in Punjab, according to Alexander Cunningham, was the favorite residence of the third successor of the dynasty, Sultan Firuz Shah, which may further support the view of their origins in the area.

During Ghazi Maliks reign, in 1321 he sent his eldest son Jauna Khan, later known as Muhammad bin Tughlaq, to Deogir to plunder the Hindu kingdoms of Arangal and Tilang (now part of Telangana). His first attempt was a failure. Four months later, Ghiyasuddin Tughlaq sent large army reinforcements for his son asking him to attempt plundering Arangal and Tilang again. This time Jauna Khan succeeded and Arangal fell, it was renamed to Sultanpur, and all plundered wealth, state treasury and captives were transferred from the captured kingdom to the Delhi Sultanate.The Muslim aristocracy in Lukhnauti (Bengal) invited Ghiyasuddin Tughlaq to extend his coup and expand eastwards into Bengal by attacking Shamsuddin Firoz Shah, which he did over 1324–1325 AD, after placing Delhi under control of his son Ulugh Khan, and then leading his army to Lukhnauti. Ghiyasuddin Tughlaq succeeded in this campaign.

After his fathers death in 1325 CE, Muhammed Bin Tughlaq assumed power and his rule saw the empire expand to most of the Indian subcontinent, its peak in terms of geographical reach. He attacked and plundered Malwa, Gujarat, Lakhnauti, Chittagong, Mithila and many other regions in India His distant campaigns were expensive, although each raid and attack on non-Muslim kingdoms brought new looted wealth and ransom payments from captured people. The extended empire was difficult to retain, and rebellions all over Indian subcontinent became routine.Muhammad bin Tughlaq died in March 1351 while trying to chase and punish people for rebellion and their refusal to pay taxes in Sindh and Gujarat.

The Tughlaq empire after Muhammed Bin Tughluqs death was in a state of disarray with many regions assuming independance, it was at this point that Firuz Shah Tughlaq, Ghazi Maliks nephew, took reign. His father's name was Rajab (the younger brother of Ghazi Malik) who had the title Sipahsalar. His mother Naila was a Punjabi Bhatti princess (daughter of Rana Mal) from Dipalpur and Abohar according the historian William Crooke. The southern states had drifted away from the Sultanate and there were rebellions in Gujarat and Sindh", while "Bengal asserted its independence." He led expeditions  against Bengal in 1353 and 1358. He captured Cuttack, desecrated the Jagannath Temple, Puri, and forced Raja Gajpati of Jajnagar in Orissa to pay tribute. He also laid siege to the Kangra Fort and forced Nagarkot to pay tribute. During his time Tatar Khan of Greater Khorasan attacked Punjab however he was defeated and his face slashed by the sword given by Feroz Shah Tughlaq to Raja Kailas Pal who ruled the Nagarkot region in Punjab.

Sayyid Dynasty (1410 AD - 1440 AD) 
After the death of the last Tughluq ruler Nasir-ud-din Mahmud, Khizr Khan established the Sayyid dynasty, the fourth dynasty of the Delhi Sultanate after the fall of the Tughlaqs. 

According to Richard M. Eaton and oriental scholar Simon Digby Khizr Khan was a Punjabi chieftain belonging to the Khokhar clan. This view is echoed by Francesca Orsini and Samira Sheikh in their work. Jaswant Lal Mehta describes Khizr Khan as a leading Indian noble who belonged to a family of Multan. According to the Dayal Das Bikaner Khyat, Malik Sulaiman, the father of Khizr Khan, while working as the Nawab of Multan, led an expedition for the recapture of Nagaur from the Rathore Rajputs and installed Firoz Khan the son of Jalal Khan Khokhar as the ruler of Nagaur. Khizr Khan's native town was Fathpur in Punjab (present-day Pakistan) which also served as the capital of the sultanate before the capture of Delhi in 1414.

Following Timur's 1398 Sack of Delhi, he appointed Khizr Khan as deputy of Multan (Punjab). He held Lahore, Dipalpur, Multan and Upper Sindh. Khizr Khan captured Delhi on 28 May 1414 thereby establishing the Sayyid dynasty. Khizr Khan did not take up the title of Sultan, but continued the fiction of his allegiance to Timur as Rayat-i-Ala(vassal) of the Timurids – initially that of Timur, and later his son Shah Rukh. After the accession of Khizr Khan, the Punjab, Uttar Pradesh and Sindh were reunited under the Delhi Sultanate, where he spent his time subduing rebellions. Punjab was the powerbase of Khizr Khan and his successors as the bulk of the Delhi army during their reigns came from Multan and Dipalpur.

Khizr Khan was succeeded by his son Sayyid Mubarak Shah after his death on 20 May 1421. Mubarak Shah referred to himself as Muizz-ud-Din Mubarak Shah on his coins, removing the Timurid name with the name of the Caliph, and declared himself a Shah. He defeated the advancing Hoshang Shah Ghori, ruler of Malwa Sultanate and forced him to pay heavy tribute early in his reign. Mubarak Shah also put down the rebellion of Jasrath Khokhar and managed to fend off multiple invasions by the Timurids of Kabul.

The last ruler of the Sayyids, Ala-ud-Din, voluntarily abdicated the throne of the Delhi Sultanate in favour of Bahlul Khan Lodi on 19 April 1451, and left for Badaun, where he died in 1478.

Lodi Dynasty (1451 AD −1526 AD) 
Later, Bahlul Lodi captured Delhi and founded the Lodi dynasty, the last of the Delhi sultanates.  The Lodi dynasty reached its peak under Bahlul's grandson Sikander Lodi. Various road and irrigation projects were taken under his rule, and the rule had patronised Persian culture. Despite this, there was still persecution of the local Hindu people as many temples, such as that of Mathura, were destroyed and had a system of widespread discrimination against Hindus. The rule of the last Lodi emperor was a weak one, and was eclipsed by the arrival of Babur's army.

Langah Sultanate

In 1445, Sultan Qutbudin, the chief of Langah tribe, established the Langah Sultanate in Multan. The reign of Sultan Husayn I who ruled from 1469 to 1498 is considered to most illustrious of the Langah Sultans. Multan experienced prosperity during this time, and a large number of Baloch settlers arrived in the city at the invitation of Shah Husayn. Shah Husayn successfully repulsed attempted invasion by the Delhi Sultans led by Tatar Khan and Barbak Shah. He fought off attempts to reinstall Shiekh Yousaf who had taken refuge under Delhi Sultans. Eventually, he signed a peace treaty with Sikander Lodhi and abducted in the favour of his son. His successor, Budhan Khan, who assumed the title Sultan Mahmud Shah I, inherited the Sultanate stretched encompassing the neighbouring regions, including the cities of Chiniot and Shorkot.

Sultan Husayn I being unable to hold his trans-Indus possessions, assigned the region around Dera Ismail Khan to Sardar Malik Sohrab Dodai Baloch in 1469 or 1471 and appointed him as "Jagir". The city was invaded during the reign of Sultan Husseyn II by ruler Shah Husayn of the Arghun dynasty, probably at Babur's insistence, who was either ethnic Mongol, or of Turkic or Turco-Mongol extraction. Multan fell in 1528 after an extended siege and Shah Husayn appointed his son Mirza Askari as governor of the city, assisted by Langar Khan, one of the powerful amirs of Sultan Mahmud Langah I. Shortly after Shah Husayn departed Multan for Thatta, however, the governor was thrown out of the city. The rebels under Sultan Mahmud II administered Multan for a time independently but in 1541, Sher Shah Suri captured Multan, and the Sultanate ended.

Founding of Sikhism

A significant event in the late 15th century Punjab was the formation of Sikhism by Guru Nanak who was born in Nankana Sahib, Punjab, Pakistan in the Lahore province of the Delhi Sultanate. The history of the Sikh faith is closely associated with the history of Punjab and the socio-political situation in the north-west of the Indian subcontinent in the 17th century. The hymns composed by Guru Nanak were later collected in the Guru Granth Sahib, the central religious scripture of the Sikhs.

Early Modern period (1526 AD  – 1849 AD)

Mughal Empire

In 1526, Babur, a descendant of Timur and Genghis Khan from the Fergana Valley was ousted from his ancestral domain in Central Asia. Bābur turned to India and crossed the Khyber Pass. He was able to secure control of Punjab, and in 1526 he decisively defeated the forces of the Delhi sultan Ibrāhīm Lodī at the First Battle of Panipat. The next year, he defeated the Rajput confederacy under Rana Sanga of Mewar, and in 1529 defeated the remnants of the Delhi sultanates. At his death in 1530 the Mughal Empire encompassed almost all of Northern India.

Bābur's son Humāyūn (reigned 1530–40 and 1555–56) had lost territory to Sher Shah Suri, launched campaigns against the Gakkhars, about whom he suspected of being friendly with the Mughals. During this period, Sher Shah constructed the Rohtas Fort near Jhelum. Following the death of Sher Shah, in 1556, the Mughal forces under Humayun defeated Sikandar at the Battle of Panipat in 1556 and re-established the Mughal Empire across the Punjab and northern India. In 1580 the Punjab was divided into two provinces, Subah of Lahore and Subah of Multan. From 1586 to 1598, Lahore remained capital of the Mughal Empire.

Over the next twenty four year, the Mughals gradually consolidated power in the Punjab. Campaigns followed to subdue local Zamindars and the Hill forts. The Gakkhars were co-opted and assimilated into the Mughal polity under Kamal Khan, son of Rai Sarang.  Akbar (reigned 1556–1605) defeated Hemu at the Second Battle of Panipat (1556) and re-established Mughal rule. Akbar's son Jahangir had furthered the size of the Mughal Empire through conquest, yet left much of the state bankrupt as a result. He was later buried in Lahore. Jahangir's son Shah Jahan (reigned 1628–1658) was known for his monuments, including the Taj Mahal. He was born in Lahore. Saadullah Khan, born into the Thaheem tribe in Punjab from Chiniot remained Grand vizier (or Prime Minister) of the Mughal empire in the period 1645 to 1656.  Shah Jahan's son Aurangzeb was deeply religious and undertook extensive campaign in Deccan. He built famous Badshahi Mosque in Lahore. Aurangzeb had instilled heavy taxes on Hindus and Sikhs that had later led to an economic depression.

During the reign of Muḥammad Shah (1719–48), the empire began to decline, accelerated by warfare and rivalries, and. After the death of Muḥammad Shah in 1748, the Marathas attacked and ruled almost all of northern India. Mughal rule was reduced to only a small area around Delhi, which passed under Maratha (1785) and the British (1803) control. The last Mughal, Bahādur Shah II (reigned 1837–57), was exiled to Burma by the British. Muslims from Punjab who rose to nobility during the Mughal Era include Wazir Khan, Adina Beg Arain, and Shahbaz Khan Kamboh.

Mughal conflicts with Sikhs
The lifetime of Guru Nanak, the founder of Sikhism, coincided with the conquest of northern India by Babur and establishment of the Mughal Empire. Jahangir ordered the execution of Guru Arjan Dev, whilst in Mughal custody, for supporting his son Khusrau Mirza's rival claim to the throne. Guru Arjan Dev's death led to the sixth Guru Guru Hargobind to declare sovereignty in the creation of the Akal Takht and the establishment of a fort to defend Amritsar. Jahangir then jailed Guru Hargobind at Gwalior, but released him after a number of years when he no longer felt threatened. The succeeding son of Jahangir, Shah Jahan, took offence at Guru Hargobind's declaration and after a series of assaults on Amritsar, forced the Sikhs to retreat to the Sivalik Hills. The ninth Guru, Guru Tegh Bahadur, moved the Sikh community to Anandpur and travelled extensively to visit and preach in defiance of Aurangzeb, who attempted to install Ram Rai as new guru.

Durrani and Maratha invasions

In 1747, the Durrani kingdom was established by the Pakhtun general, Ahmad Shah Abdali. The first time Ahmad Shah invaded Hindustan, the Mughal imperial army checked his advance successfully. Yet subsequent events led to a double alliance, one by marriage and another politically, between the Afghan King and the Mughal Emperor. The battle of Panipat was the effect of this political alliance. After the victory of Panipat, Ahmad Shah Durrani became the primary ruler over Northern India. The influence of Durrani monarch continued in Northern India up to his death.

In 1757, the Sikhs were persistently ambushing guards to loot trains. In order to send a message, and prevent such occurrences from recurring, Ahmad Shah destroyed the Shri Harimandir Sahib and filled the Sarovar (Holy water pool) with cow carcasses.

In 1758 the Maratha Empire's general Raghunathrao attacked and conquered Lahore and Attock driving out Timur Shah Durrani, the son and viceroy of Ahmad Shah Abdali, in the process. Lahore, Multan, Kashmir and other subahs on the eastern side of Attock were under Maratha rule. In Punjab and Kashmir, the Marathas were now major players. In 1761, following the victory at the Third battle of Panipat between the Durrani and the Maratha Empire, Ahmad Shah Abdali captured remnants of the Maratha Empire in Punjab and Kashmir regions and had consolidated control over them.

In 1762, there were persistent conflicts with the Sikhs. Vadda Ghalughara took place under the Muslim provincial government based at Lahore to wipe out the Sikhs, with 30,000 Sikhs being killed, an offensive that had begun with the Mughals, with the Chhota Ghallughara, and lasted several decades under its Muslim successor states. The rebuilt Harminder Sahib was destroyed, and the pool was filled with cow entrails, again.

Sikh Empire

In 1799, a process to unify Punjab was started by Ranjit Singh. Training his army under the style of the East India Company, he was able to conquer much of Punjab and surrounding areas. The invasions of Zaman Shah, the second successor of Ahmad Shah Abdali had served as a catalyst. After the first invasion, Singh had recovered his own fort at Rohtas. During the second invasion, he had emerged as a leading Sikh chief. After the third invasion, he had decisively defeated Zamah Shah. This had eventually led to the takeover of Lahore in 1799. In 1809, Singh signed the Treaty of Amritsar with the British; in this treaty, Singh was recognised as the sole ruler of Punjab up to River Sutlej by the British.

Within ten years of Ranjit Singh's death in 1839, the Empire was taken over by the British who had already more or less exerted indirect or direct influence throughout the Subcontinent. At Lahore, there were increasing levels of nobles vying for power. A growing instability, allowed the British to come in and take over control of the area. After the British victories at the battles of the Sutlej in 1845–46, the army and territory of the boy Raja Duleep Singh was cut down. Lahore was garrisoned by British troops, and given a resident in the Durbar. In 1849, the British had formally taken control.

Kingdom of Bahawalpur
The Bahawalpur state was founded in 1609 AD by Nawab Bahawal Khan Abbasi. The role of Bahawalpur state was important as the sole surviving Muslim state in Punjab. On 22 February 1833, Abbasi III entered into a subsidiary alliance with the British, to get protection against the expanding Sikh Empire. When British rule ended in 1947 and British India was partitioned into India and Pakistan, Bahawalpur joined the Dominion of Pakistan. Bahawalpur remained an autonomous entity until 14 October 1955, when it was merged with the province of West Pakistan.

Colonial period (1849 AD – 1947 AD)

The Punjab was annexed by the East India Company in 1849. Although nominally part of the Bengal Presidency it was administratively independent. During the Indian Rebellion of 1857, apart from Revolt led by Ahmed Khan Kharal and Murree rebellion of 1857, the Punjab remained relatively peaceful. In 1858, under the terms of the Queen's Proclamation issued by Queen Victoria, the Punjab came under the direct rule of Britain.

Colonial rule had a profound impact on all areas of Punjabi life. Economically it transformed the Punjab into the richest farming area of India, socially it sustained the power of large landowners and politically it encouraged cross-communal co-operation amongst land owning groups. The Punjab also became the major centre of recruitment into the Indian Army. By patronising influential local allies and focusing administrative, economic and constitutional policies on the rural population, the British ensured the loyalty of its large rural population.

Administratively, colonial rule instated a system of bureaucracy and measure of the law. The 'paternal' system of the ruling elite was replaced by 'machine rule' with a system of laws, codes, and procedures. For purposes of control, the British established new forms of communication and transportation, including post systems, railways, roads, and telegraphs. The creation of Canal Colonies in western Punjab between 1860 and 1947 brought 14 million acres of land under cultivation, and revolutionised agricultural practices in the region. To the agrarian and commercial class was added a professional middle class that had risen the social ladder through the use of the English education, which opened up new professions in law, government, and medicine.

Despite these developments, colonial rule was marked by exploitation of resources. For the purpose of exports, the majority of external trade was controlled by British export banks. The Imperial government exercised control over the finances of Punjab and took the majority of the income for itself.

Religious revivalism
A highlight of religious controversy during this time was that of the Ahmaddiya movement, initiated by Mirza Ghulam Ahmad. In his Burahin-i-Ahmaddiya, which was meant to rejuvenate Islam on the basis of the Quran, he had attempted to refute both Christian missionaries, and Hindus and Sikhs. In another work, Ahmad argued that Guru Nanak was a Muslim. He interpreted Jihad as a peaceful method, and declared himself to be the Messiah. This was met with significant controversy.

In the first and second decades of the early 20th century, the idea of Hindu and Muslim separation had become an active political tone. Muslims were told to remain aloof of the Indian National Congress, the main body seeking Indian Independence, because there was a general fear that representation based on elections and employment-based upon competition was not in their interest. The All-India Muslim League's demand for separate electorates for Muslims was granted at Amritsar in 1909. The Muslim League also demanded separate electorates in every province, even in those without Muslim majority populations, which was also granted by the Indian National Congress in 1916.

Railways
In 1862, the first section of railway in the Punjab was constructed between Lahore and Amritsar, and Lahore Junction railway station opened. Lines were opened between Lahore and Multan in 1864, and Amritsar and Delhi in 1870.  The Scinde, Punjab and Delhi railways merged to form the Scinde, Punjab & Delhi Railway in 1870, creating a link between Karachi and Lahore via Multan. The Punjab Northern State Railway linked Lahore and Peshawar in 1883. By 1886, the independent railways had amalgamated into North Western State Railway.

Education
In 1854, the Punjab education department was instituted with a policy to provide secular education in all government managed institutions. Privately run institutions would only receive grants-in-aid in return for providing secular instruction. By 1864 this had resulted in a situation whereby all grants-in-aid to higher education schools and colleges were received by institutions under European management, and no indigenous owned schools received government help. In 1882, University of Punjab was established in Lahore, the 4th university to be established in South Asia. In 1884, a reorganisation of the Punjab education system occurred, introducing measures tending towards decentralisation of control over education and the promotion of an indigenous education agency. As a consequence several new institutions were encouraged in the province. The Arya Samaj opened a college in Lahore in 1886, the Sikhs opened the Khalsa College whilst the Anjuman-i-Himayat-i-Islam stepped in to organise Muslim education.

Unrest
An important event of the British Raj in Punjab was the Jallianwala Bagh massacre. In 1919, Brigadier-General Reginald Dyer led fifty riflemen from the 1/9th Gurkhas, 54th Sikhs, and 59th Sikhs into the Bagh and ordered them to open fire into the crowd that had gathered there. The official number of deaths, as reported by the British government, was given as 379 killed, but some reports claimed that more than 1,000 were killed. There had been many Indian independence movements in Punjab at the time as well. Notably, the actions of Bhagat Singh, Sukhdev, and Rajguru on 17 December 1928 in which the trio was responsible for killing J.P. Saunders in revenge for the latter's killing of Lala Lajpat Rai. They were also responsible for the bombing of the Legislative Assembly in Delhi on 8 April in 1929. The three believed that the nonviolent movement was a failure. Nevertheless, the use of violence in the Indian independence movement became unpopular after the execution of the trio on 23 March 1931.

Politics
Punjab Legislative Council was established by colonial authorities under Government of India Act 1919. The Government of India Act 1935 introduced introduced increased provincial autonomy to Punjab replacing the system of dyarchy. It provided for the constitution of Punjab Legislative Assembly of 175 members presided by a Speaker and an executive government responsible to the Assembly. The Unionist Party under Sir Sikandar Hayat Khan formed the government in 1937. Sir Sikandar was succeeded by Malik Khizar Hayat Tiwana in 1942 who remained the Premier of the Punjab till partition in 1947. The Unionist Party dominated Punjabi politics from the 1920s until the Second World War.  Its influence over the rural population severely limited the local appeal and reach of both the Indian National Congress and Muslim League. A strong supporter of colonial rule, the Unionists were weakened by the war as they were directed to sacrifice their political interests to support the war effort. Unable to placate their traditional support base with benefits from the colonial administration, they suffered a loss of authority which led to their disastrous performance at the 1946 Punjab Provincial Assembly election and a breakdown in inter-communal cooperation at a political level. Although the term of the Assembly was five years, the Assembly continued for about eight years and its last sitting was held on 19 March 1945.

Partition of Punjab (1947)

In 1947, the Punjab Province of British India was divided along religious lines into West Punjab and East Punjab, with East Punjab containing modern states of Indian Punjab, Haryana and Himachal Pradesh. The Partition of India in 1947 split the former Raj province of Punjab; the mostly Muslim western part became the Pakistani province of West Punjab and the mostly Sikh and Hindu eastern part became the Indian province of Punjab. Many Sikhs and Hindus lived in the west, and many Muslims lived in the east, and so partition saw many people displaced and much intercommunal violence. All Punjabi princely states, except Bahawalpur, also became part of India.

The undivided Punjab, of which Punjab (Pakistan) forms a major region today, was home to a large minority population of Sikhs and Hindus unto 1947 apart from the Muslim majority. The Gurdaspur district which is partially now part of the Indian state of Punjab had a slight Muslim majority (50.2% according to the 1941 census) prior to the partition. Many Muslims fled the partition violence to settle in Pakistan.

As stated, a major consequence of partition was the sudden shift towards religious homogeneity occurred in all districts across Punjab owing to the new international border that cut through the province. This rapid demographic shift was primarily due to wide scale migration but also caused by large-scale religious cleansing riots which were witnessed across the region at the time. According to historical demographer Tim Dyson, in the eastern regions of Punjab that ultimately became Indian Punjab following independence, districts that were 66% Hindu in 1941 became 80% Hindu in 1951; those that were 20% Sikh became 50% Sikh in 1951. Conversely, in the western regions of Punjab that ultimately became Pakistani Punjab, all districts became almost exclusively Muslim by 1951.

After Independence

Punjabi Subah
After independence, the Akali Dal, a Sikh-dominated political party active mainly in Punjab, sought to create a Sikh State but idea was not very popular. However, there was push in many regions of India for reorganisation of states based on language. In Punjab, instead of religion, the Akalis launched the Punjabi Suba movement aimed at creation of a Punjabi-majority subah ("province") in the erstwhile East Punjab state of India in the 1950s.In 1966, it resulted in the formation of the Punjabi speaking -majority Punjab state, the Haryanvi-Hindi-majority Haryana state and the Union Territory of Chandigarh. Some Pahari majority parts of the East Punjab were also merged with Himachal Pradesh as a result of the movement.

Khalistan Movement
Sikhs called for the creation of a separate Sikh homeland known as Khalistan in the 1970s, along with the lines of Pakistan. This had led to the state of emergency given by Indira Gandhi, who felt if Khalistan was created it would render a much weaker Indian nation. Especially since that region of the country provided up to 70% of the nations wheat, earning the Punjab region the name, “Bread Basket of India”. During the Green Revolution in India incentives were given to the people of Punjab to switch to growing strictly wheat since India was unable to feed many of its people. Gandhi called in Indian troops to extinguish the few militants who had taken shelter in the Golden Temple, killing thousands of civilians in the crossfire. Attacks then targeted the Punjab State police and Indian Security forces that opposed the creation of Khalistan and wished Punjab stay under Indian rule. Some extremists carried out a terror attack placing a bomb in an Air India flight over the Atlantic Ocean, killing more than 300 people. Much of the funding for the separatist revolutionaries had come from sources abroad in America and Europe, and some of the Sikh separatist movements were based in Pakistan.

See also
History of Pakistan
History of India

Notes

References

Bibliography

Books

 Ali, Imran. The Punjab under imperialism, 1885-1947 (2014).
 
 
 
 Condos,  Mark. The Insecurity State: Punjab and the Making of Colonial Power in British India (2020) excerpt 
 
 
 
 Gandhi, R. (2013). of the Book: Punjab: A History from Aurangzeb to Mountbatten.

Journals
 
 
 Talbot, I. A. (1980). "The 1946 Punjab Elections" Modern Asian Studies 14(1), 65-91 online .

Theses

Further reading
 R. M. Chopra, "The Legacy of the Punjab", (1997), Punjabee Bradree, Calcutta.

 
Punjab
Punjab
Punjab